Lewis Nixon (April 7, 1861 – September 23, 1940) was a naval architect, shipbuilding executive, public servant, and political activist. He designed the United States' first modern battleships, and supervised the construction of its first modern submarines, all before his 40th birthday.  He was briefly the leader of Tammany Hall. He started an ill-fated effort to run seven major American shipyards under common ownership as the United States Shipbuilding Company, and he was the chair of the New York City commission building the Williamsburg Bridge.

Birth and naval education

Nixon was born on the eve of the American Civil War, in Leesburg, Virginia, to Colonel Joel Lewis Nixon and Mary Jane Turner. Leesburg, only three miles into the Confederacy, changed hands several times over the course of the War. His brother George H. Nixon fought in the Virginia Cavalry as a member of "Mosby's Raiders."

Nixon graduated first in his class from the United States Naval Academy in 1882 and was sent to study naval architecture at the Royal Naval College, Greenwich, where, in 1885, he again graduated first in the class.

Shipbuilding and other businesses

While in Pennsylvania, he earned a Doctor of Science degree from Villanova University.

Soon after the contracts for the battleships were awarded, he resigned from the Navy to work as Superintendent of Construction for William Cramp & Sons Shipbuilding Company, the shipyard that won the lead contract.

In 1891, Nixon married Sally Lewis Wood of Washington, D.C., a descendant of General Andrew Lewis of Colonial Virginia. Their son was Stanhope Wood Nixon, whom Adolfo Müller-Ury painted full-length in Scottish costume in 1902-1903. She would die on June 15, 1937, three years before Nixon himself. 

In January 1895, Nixon leased the Crescent Shipyard in Elizabeth, New Jersey, and launched his own business. His superintendent-in-charge was  Arthur Leopold Busch, another former William Cramp & Sons shipbuilder and naval architect who had come from Great Britain to Philadelphia in 1892. Under Nixon (and Busch), this yard built many vessels, including torpedo boats  and ], cruiser , monitor , gunboat , and Anstice yacht (1902) that was renamed the Sandy Hook.  
  
The submarine's success led to an order for more submarines of the "Holland Type" by the Navy. Those subs, known as the s, were built at the Crescent Shipyard and the Union Iron Works, a shipbuilding firm near Mare Island Naval Shipyard, 20 miles north of San Francisco. These submarines became America's first fleet of underwater fighting vessels, and were operated by the United States Navy on both coasts.

These submarines also gave birth to a new company, founded by John Philip Holland on February 7, 1899. His company was then known as the Holland Torpedo Boat Company and (after 1904) the Electric Boat Company.

Nixon also founded the International Smokeless Powder and Dynamite Company of Parlin, New Jersey. E. I. du Pont de Nemours and Company acquired it company from Nixon in 1904, forming part of what would soon be deemed DuPont's unlawful monopoly of the gunpowder industry.

Nixon also founded the United States Long Distance Automobile Company. From 1901 to 1903, its Jersey City, New Jersey, factory manufactured gasoline-powered cars "to meet the requirements of those who seek simplicity of construction, economy in running and unusual strength and durability."  In January 1904, the company became Standard Motor Construction Company, which manufactured a larger car called a "Standard" through 1905. The auto lines were then sold to Hewitt Motor Co. of New York City. Nixon continued to serve as Standard Motor Construction's president into the next decade, when it was a major manufacturer of marine engines.

In 1902, promoter John W. Young persuaded Nixon to preside over the consolidation of Crescent Shipyard with six other shipyards on the East and West Coasts, to form a single shipbuilding trust, under the name United States Shipbuilding Company. Unfortunately, "the one thing [the consolidated firms] lacked, individually and collectively, was a realistic prospect of earning sustained profits." As the newly formed company's president, Nixon had convinced Charles M. Schwab, the U.S. Steel Corporation president and Bethlehem Steel owner, to help underwrite the new business, while Schwab agreed to add Bethlehem Steel to the venture. However, the terms that Nixon and Schwab had negotiated for Schwab's financing were so one-sided in favor of Schwab and Bethlehem Steel that, when United States Shipbuilding failed almost immediately, it damaged the business reputations of both Nixon and Schwab.  Within a year of its incorporation, the company's mortgage-holders forced it into receivership. It emerged from receivership, without Nixon, as Bethlehem Steel and Shipbuilding Company, in 1904. One of its first actions was to close Crescent Shipyard.  By then, Nixon had re-entered the shipbuilding business by leasing a yard in Perth Amboy, New Jersey.

From late 1904 to January 1906, Nixon was in Russia supervising the construction of ten torpedo boats for the navy of Czar Nicholas II.

Nixon suggested numerous changes including the required use of wireless communication devices on ships. He also suggested that ships have a more efficient way of reversing.

In 1910 the Swiss-born American artist Adolfo Müller-Ury (1862–1947) completed a three-quarter-length seated portrait of Nixon that was exhibited at Knoedler's that December.
 
From 1915 until his death, Nixon was president of the Nixon Nitration Works, in what is now the Nixon section of Edison, New Jersey.  A 1924 explosion and resulting fire destroyed much of the Works, which was then rebuilt and resumed operations.

He died on September 23, 1940 at Monmouth Memorial Hospital in Long Branch, New Jersey.

Public service and political activism
In 1895, the New York Legislature authorized the East River Bridge Commission to undertake a second span across the river, ultimately known as the Williamsburg Bridge. In January 1898 New York City Mayor Robert Anderson Van Wyck sacked the entire membership of the Commission, complaining of its slow and expensive pace. He appointed Nixon as the Commission's new president. Nixon continued to serve as the Commission's president during the bridge's construction until the Commission's powers were transferred to the Commissioner of Bridges on January 1, 1902.

Nixon was also active in Democratic Party politics.  In December 1901, longtime Tammany Hall boss Richard Croker chose Nixon as his successor.  Croker's choice of Nixon surprised observers, because Nixon had spoken out against vice and corruption in City government, and seemingly had nothing in common with Croker. Nixon resigned several months later, explaining that "I find that I cannot retain my self-respect and remain the leader of the Tammany organization."

He was a delegate to the Democratic National Convention seven times. A friend and supporter of three-time Democratic presidential nominee William Jennings Bryan, Nixon played a key role in the 1908 Democratic National Convention, where he chaired the subcommittee on the platform, overcame Tammany's initial hostility to Bryan to deliver New York's delegation for him, and was urged as Bryan's running-mate.

A resident of Staten Island, Nixon served from 1914 to 1915 as the borough's Acting Commissioner of Public Works and its consulting engineer.

In 1919, New York Governor Al Smith appointed Nixon as the State's Superintendent of Public Works, and then as New York City's Regulatory Public Service Commissioner.

Legacy
Nixon was the grandfather of Lewis Nixon III, an officer in the 101st Airborne Division during WWII, who was made famous by the miniseries Band of Brothers.

References
Notes

Sources

External links
 
Crescent Shipyard information at globalSecurity.com
CorpWatch : General Dynamics  at www.corpwatch.org History and origins of Electric Boat/General Dynamics. Company foundation begins here at Crescent Shipyard, Elizabeth, New Jersey.
More detailed account of first U.S. Navy submarines built at Crescent and Mare Island Naval Shipyard/Union Iron Works.

1861 births
1940 deaths
Graduates of the Royal Naval College, Greenwich
American naval architects
United States Naval Academy alumni
United States Navy officers
Leaders of Tammany Hall
New York State Superintendents of Public Works
Commissioners in New York City
People from Leesburg, Virginia
New York (state) Democrats